Saint-Beauzire may refer to the following places in France:

 Saint-Beauzire, Haute-Loire, a commune in the Haute-Loire department
 Saint-Beauzire, Puy-de-Dôme, a commune in the Puy-de-Dôme department